Stary is a surname. Notable people with the surname include:

 Rob Stary, Australian criminal defence lawyer
 Jaroslav Starý (died 1989), Czech fencer
 Jaroslav Starý (born 1988), Czech footballer